Tormish (also Romanized as Tormīsh; also known as Torahmīsh and Toryamesh) is a village in Gejlarat-e Sharqi Rural District, Aras District, Poldasht County, West Azerbaijan Province, Iran. At the 2006 census, its population was 340, in 54 families.

References 

Populated places in Poldasht County